Emile Paul Joseph Duson (December 1, 1904 in Semarang, Dutch East Indies – March 15, 1942 in Tiga Rungu, Sumatra, Dutch East Indies) was a Dutch field hockey player who competed in the 1928 Summer Olympics. He was a member of the Dutch field hockey team, which won the silver medal. He played all four matches as halfback.

He was executed by Japanese soldiers during World War II.

References

External links
 
profile

1904 births
1942 deaths
Dutch male field hockey players
Olympic field hockey players of the Netherlands
Field hockey players at the 1928 Summer Olympics
Olympic silver medalists for the Netherlands
People from Semarang
Olympic medalists in field hockey
Medalists at the 1928 Summer Olympics
Dutch military personnel killed in World War II
Prisoners who died in Japanese detention
Dutch prisoners of war in World War II
Royal Netherlands East Indies Army personnel of World War II
Dutch people of the Dutch East Indies
20th-century Dutch people